This is the list of episodes for the original Skippy the Bush Kangaroo series, aired from 1968 to 1970.

It has been difficult to determine a proper order for Skippy episodes. The official numbering has many anomalies. The airdate order is also difficult to obtain, as the series was screened in a completely different sequence in different cities.

Season 1 (1968)

Season 2 (1968-1969)

Season 3 (1970)

Lists of Australian children's television series episodes
Skippy the Bush Kangaroo